Rozdolne (until December 1944, Aksheykh [Ак-Шейх]) is an urban-type settlement in the Autonomous Republic of Crimea, a territory recognized by a majority of countries as part of Ukraine and incorporated by Russia as the Republic of Crimea. The town also serves as the administrative center of the Rozdolne Raion (district), housing the district's local administration buildings.

As of the 2001 Ukrainian Census, its population was 8,163. Current population: 

The village of Deutsch-Akscheich (Ак-Шеих Немецкий) was founded by Black Sea German settlers from the Berdyansk area in 1897.

See also
 Novoselivske, the other urban-type settlement in Rozdolne Raion of Crimea

References

Urban-type settlements in Crimea
Rozdolne Raion